Alien Encounters may refer to:

 Alien Encounters (comics), an American science fiction anthology comic book
 Alien Encounters (TV series) a science fiction mini series
 Starship Invasions, also released as Alien Encounter, a 1977 Canadian science fiction film

See also
 Close Encounters (disambiguation)